This is a list of the candidates who ran for the Progressive Conservative Association of Alberta in the 28th Alberta provincial election. The party ran a full slate of 87, winning 61.

Calgary area (28 seats)

Edmonton area (26 seats)

Remainder of province (33 seats)

See also
Alberta Electoral Boundary Re-distribution, 2010

References

2012
2012 Alberta general election